The Other Side of Something is the third studio album and fourth album overall from Christian singer and songwriter Sara Groves, and it released on March 23, 2004 by INO Records. The producers on the album is Charlie Peacock and Nate Sabin. This release became critically acclaimed and commercially successful.

Critical reception

The Other Side of Something garnered critical acclaim from music critics. At Christianity Today, Russ Breimeier rated the album five stars, stating that "It's to the point where you can reliably count on Sara Groves for smart, sincere pop music that stimulates the mind and soul" and on this album she "takes it one step further." Peter Bate of Cross Rhythms rated it eight out of ten squares, writing that it comes with "quality songwriting" that "resonates nicely." At CCM Magazine, Lizza Connor graded the album an A−, saying that the album "covers new lyrical ground, the sonic element also swings to something unique." Founder John DiBiase of Jesus Freak Hideout rated the album four-and-a-half stars, affirming that "The Other Side Of Something should not be missed." At The Phantom Tollbooth, Brian A. Smith rated the album four tocks, highlighting that "The result is eleven songs that are real, raw, and sometimes painful, as she not only reveals her own weaknesses, but our as well if we are paying attention to the lyrics."

Commercial performance
For the Billboard charting week of April 10, 2004, The Other Side of Something was the No. 29 most sold album in the Christian music market via the Christian Albums position. Also, it placed at No. 32 on the breaking-and-entry chart the Heatseekers Albums.

Track listing

Personnel 
 Sara Groves – lead vocals, backing vocals (1, 2, 3, 5–11), arrangements (11)
 Charlie Peacock – acoustic piano (1, 3, 6), programming (1, 3, 7), backing vocals (1, 7), keyboards (3, 6), Rhodes piano (7)
 Jeff Roach – keyboards (2, 4, 5, 8–11)
 Roger Smith – Hammond B3 organ (6, 7)
 Scott Denté – acoustic guitar (1, 3)
 Jerry McPherson – electric guitar (1, 3, 6, 7), guitar (2, 4, 5, 8–11), dobro (6)
 Matt Patrick – additional guitar (2), backing vocals (2, 9), acoustic guitar (11), dulcimer (11)
 Mark Hill – bass (1, 3, 6)
 Matt Pierson – bass (2, 4, 5, 8–11)
 Danny O'Lannerghty – acoustic bass (7)
 Steve Brewster – drums, percussion (4, 5, 8–11)
 Ken Lewis – percussion (1, 3, 6)
 John Catchings – cello (2, 5, 10)
 Monisa Angell – viola (5, 10)
 David Davidson – violin (7)
 Dick Hensold – Northumbrian pipes (11)
 Chris Eaton – backing vocals (1, 3, 6)
 Chris Brown – backing vocals (2)
 Lori Sabin – backing vocals (2, 5, 9)
 Nate Sabin – backing vocals (2, 5, 9, 10, 11), harmonica (9)
 Chris Altamirano – backing vocals (5, 11)
 Harmony LeBeff – backing vocals (5)
 Sara Renner – backing vocals (5)
 Billy Steele – backing vocals (5)
 Terry Greener – backing vocals (9)
 Kirby Groves – backing vocals (9)
 Troy Groves – backing vocals (9)
 Becca Harrington – backing vocals (9)
 Greyley Sabin – backing vocals (9)
 Josh Stigen – backing vocals (9)

Charts

References

2004 albums
Sara Groves albums
INO Records albums
Albums produced by Charlie Peacock